The Hazara Students Federation (HSF), is an organization in Pakistan for students from Hazara families. It was founded in 1974.

References

Hazara politics
Student organisations in Pakistan
Student organizations established in 1974